The brown booby (Sula leucogaster) is a large seabird of the booby family Sulidae, of which it is perhaps the most common and widespread species. It has a pantropical range, which overlaps with that of other booby species. The gregarious brown booby commutes and forages at low height over inshore waters. Flocks plunge-dive to take small fish, especially when these are driven near the surface by their predators. They only nest on the ground, and roost on solid objects rather than the water surface.

Taxonomy 
The brown booby was described by the French polymath Georges-Louis Leclerc, Comte de Buffon in his Histoire Naturelle des Oiseaux in 1781. The bird was also illustrated in a hand-coloured plate engraved by François-Nicolas Martinet in the Planches Enluminées D'Histoire Naturelle which was produced under the supervision of Edme-Louis Daubenton to accompany Buffon's text. Buffon did not include a scientific name with his description but in 1783 the Dutch naturalist Pieter Boddaert coined the binomial name Pelecanus leucogaster in his catalogue of the Planches Enluminées. The type locality is Cayenne in French Guiana. The current genus Sula was introduced by the French zoologist Mathurin Jacques Brisson in 1760. The word Sula is Norwegian for a gannet; the specific leucogaster is from Ancient Greek leuko for "white" and gastēr for "belly".

There are four recognised subspecies:
 S. l. leucogaster (Boddaert, 1783) – Caribbean and Atlantic Islands
 S. l. brewsteri Nathaniel Stickney Goss, 1888 – Pacific coasts of USA and Mexico
 S. l. etesiaca Thayer & Bangs, 1905 – Pacific coasts of Central America and Colombia
 S. l. plotus (Forster, JR, 1844) – Red Sea through the Indian Ocean to the west and central Pacific

Description 
The booby's head and upper body (back) is covered in dark brown to black plumage, with the remainder (belly) being a contrasting white. The bare part colours vary geographically, but not seasonally. The species also displays sexual dimorphism of the bare part colours, the males having a blue orbital ring, as opposed to the yellow orbital ring of the female. In addition the male of subspecies S. l. brewsteri is distinctly plumaged in having the forehead, forecrown and chin white, merging to a greyish brown neck and breast.

Unlike other species of sulid the juvenile plumage already resembles that of the adult. They are gray-brown with darkening on the head, upper surfaces of the wings and tail, while the lower breast and underpart plumages are heavily flecked brown on white. Juveniles of subspecies S. l. brewsteri are once again distinct in having the underpart plumage more evenly mouse brown.

Their beaks are quite sharp and contain many jagged edges. They have fairly short wings resulting in a fast flap rate, but long, tapered tails. While these birds are typically silent, bird watchers have reported occasional sounds similar to grunting or quacking.

Ecology 

This species breeds on islands and coasts in the pantropical areas of the Atlantic and Pacific oceans.  They frequent the breeding grounds of the islands in the Gulf of Mexico and the Caribbean Sea. With the rise in pollution in the world, brown boobies have been using marine debris to make their nests. 90.1 percent of these nest were consisted of plastic, while nests near shipwreck have a high percentage of the wreckage debris. This bird nests in large colonies, laying two chalky blue eggs on the ground in a mound of broken shells and vegetation, but usually raises just one chick, the second one to hatch being unable to compete for food with its older sibling, or even ejected from the nest by it. It winters at sea over a wider area.

Brown booby pairs may remain together over several seasons. They perform elaborate greeting rituals, and are also spectacular divers, plunging into the ocean at high speed. They mainly eat small fish (such as flying fish, mullet, halfbeaks, anchovies, goatfish, crowned squirrelfish and Indian mackerel
), squid (including the family Ommastrephidae) or shrimp which gather in groups near the surface and may catch leaping fish while skimming the surface. Along with plunge-diving, some fledglings and some adults practice kleptoparasitism, where they steal prey from other seabirds. For example, brown boobies have been observed stealing prey from great frigatebirds as they transfer food to their young. Although they are powerful and agile fliers, they are particularly clumsy in takeoffs and landings; they use strong winds and high perches to assist their takeoffs.

Gallery

References

Further reading

External links 
 
 
 Brown booby videos, photos & sounds on the Internet Bird Collection

Boobies
Birds of the Atlantic Ocean
Birds of Australia
Birds of Brazil
Birds of Cape Verde
Birds of the Caribbean
Birds of the Dominican Republic
Birds of the Indian Ocean
Birds of the Pacific Ocean
Birds of the Gulf of Guinea
Fauna of Ascension Island
Brown booby
Articles containing video clips
Pantropical fauna
Brown booby